The Council of State is a body established by the Constitution of Ireland to advise the President of Ireland in the exercise of many of their discretionary, reserve powers. It also has authority to provide for the temporary exercise of the duties of the president if these cannot be exercised by either the president or the Presidential Commission (an eventuality that is very unlikely to occur, since it would require the simultaneous absence of the President and two members of the three-member Commission).

Members
The Council of State consists of a number of government officials, who sit ex officio, as well as certain former office holders and up to seven individuals of the president's own choosing. The ex officio members comprise the attorney general as well as individuals from each of three branches of government: legislature, executive and judiciary.

Unlike most of the president's other duties, which must be conducted in accordance with the advice of the cabinet, the seven presidential appointees to the Council of State are chosen at the president's absolute discretion. These appointees retain their positions until the president's successor takes office.

The Constitution explicitly states that members appointed by the President may resign, or be dismissed by the President. Former office holders are members if "able and willing to act as a member", which implies an ability to resign; but there is no provision for dismissing them. When the McCracken Tribunal found in 1997 that former Taoiseach Charles Haughey had misled the Tribunal, there were calls for him to formally resign from the Council of State. He did not do so, although he sent his regrets to subsequent meetings of the council until his death.

Members of the Council of State may be excused from jury duty.

The Constitution specifies a declaration of office, "in the presence of Almighty God", which a new member must take before attending an official meeting. Tánaiste Éamon Gilmore, a declared agnostic, sought legal advice before attending the 2013 Council meeting. The 1996 Constitutional Review Group recommended making the religious part optional.

Role
Before exercising any reserve power but one, the President is required to seek the advice of the Council of State, although not required to follow its advice. The one exception, where the President has "absolute discretion", is in deciding to refuse a dissolution to a Taoiseach who has lost the confidence of the Dáil. The remaining discretionary powers, which do require prior consultation with the Council of State, are as follows (for a detailed description of the president's reserve powers see: President of Ireland#Discretionary powers):
 Convening a meeting of either or both Houses of the Oireachtas
 Addressing the Oireachtas
 Addressing the Nation
 Establishing a committee of privileges to resolve a dispute between the Houses over a putative money bill
 Abridging the time for considering a bill in the Seanad
 Referring a bill to the Supreme Court to test its Constitutionality
 Referring a bill to the people for an "ordinary referendum"

The draft of the Constitution gave more powers to the Council of State. Article 13 allows additional powers to be given to the President acting on the advice of the Government; originally, it was the advice of the Council of State that was to be required. Article 14 provides for a Presidential Commission as the collective vice-presidency of the state when the President is absent; originally the Council of State was to fill this function. Nevertheless, under Article 14.4 of the constitution the Council of State, acting by a majority of its members, has authority to "make such provision as to them may seem meet" for the exercise of the duties of the president in any contingency the constitution does not foresee. This provision has never been invoked.

The Third Amendment of the Constitution Bill, 1958, which was defeated at a referendum, gave a role for the Council of State in the work of an envisaged constituency boundary commission.

Close to the time of its inception, the Council of State was likened to a privy council, although Jim Duffy calls this "more apparent than real" as it has no legislative or judicial functions. Gemma Hussey, who was a member of the Council of State in 1989–90, described it as "largely a symbolic body". Actress Siobhán McKenna, appointed to the council by Patrick Hillery, suggested in the 1980s that the Council approach Ronald Reagan regarding the Troubles in Northern Ireland; Hillery's secretary remarked there was "no point in trying to explain" to McKenna that the council had no role in such matters.

Meetings 
Working meetings called by the President for consultation under the terms of the Constitution are rare, though less so since the election of Mary Robinson in 1990. Four meetings have related to an address the Oireachtas, which requires the approval of the Government as well as the consultation of the Council of State. All other meetings have been to advise the President about whether to refer a bill to the Supreme Court.

Meetings are held in Áras an Uachtaráin. Members arrive 15 minutes before the meeting starts, and are served light refreshments in the Council of State Room. At the first meeting of the Council in Mary McAleese's first term, there was a photocall in the State Reception Rooms. The council's deliberations are held in camera, as for cabinet meetings, though there is no explicit requirement for confidentiality. The Irish Times obtained details of a 1984 meeting from an unnamed attendee, while James Dooge discussed a 1976 meeting years later with journalist Stephen Collins. A 2019 legal request for records of 1999 and 2002 council meetings was rejected by the Supreme Court in 2022 on the grounds that the President's constitutional immunity from judicial scrutiny extended to the Council of State. Members are seated in order of precedence in the Presidents' Room around a 1927 dining table purchased by President de Valera in 1961. The Secretary-General to the President serves as clerk to the council. The Council does not offer collective advice; the President asks each member in turn to comment, and further discussion may involve several members.

Apart from the Council of State's official meetings, its members are invited to important state functions, such as state funerals, the National Day of Commemoration, and the inauguration of the next President. The first President, Douglas Hyde, dined monthly with the members of his Council of State. The seven new presidential nominees of Mary McAleese's second term were introduced at a luncheon in the Áras the month after their appointment. Campaigning in the 1990 presidential election, Mary Robinson promised to have meetings of the Council regularly rather than on "an emergency basis".

Addresses to the Oireachtas

Referring of bills
In some cases, the President has decided to sign the bill (thereby enacting it) without referring it to the Supreme Court; in other cases, the President has referred the bill (or sections of it) and the court has upheld its constitutionality; and in other cases the Court has found some or all of the referred portions to be unconstitutional. It is not revealed whether some or all members of the Council of State counselled for or against the President's course of action.

Jim Duffy in 1991 criticised the lack of supporting resources for members of the council; at meetings they were provided only with a copy of the Constitution. By contrast, prior to the 2013 meeting to discuss the Protection of Life During Pregnancy Bill, a dossier of background information was sent to each member, including legal briefs and news reports.

Although the serving Chief Justice is a member of the council, by convention they do not get involved in substantive discussions on the bill, as they will be involved in the deliberations if the bill does get referred. Therefore, retired Chief Justices and the President of the High Court play a greater role in the discussion. The 2013 meeting was the first at which two serving members of the Supreme Court were present, as John Murray is an ex-Chief Justice but was then an ordinary member of the Court, the first such since the term of the Chief Justice was limited to seven years in 1997.

See also
 :Category:Members of the Council of State (Ireland)
 Council of State
 Privy Council of Ireland

References

Footnotes

External links

 Council of State Official website of the President of Ireland
 

 
Politics of the Republic of Ireland
Office of the President of Ireland